The fourteenth season of Family Guy aired on Fox in the United States from September 27, 2015, to May 22, 2016. The season contained 20 episodes.

The series follows the dysfunctional Griffin family, consisting of father Peter, mother Lois, daughter Meg, son Chris, baby Stewie and the family dog Brian, who reside in their hometown of Quahog. Season 14 contains the series' 250th episode, which is the season premiere.

Guest stars for the season include Joe Buck, Kyle Chandler, Glenn Close, Anil Kapoor, Kate McKinnon, John Mellencamp, Ed O'Neill, Liam Payne, Louis Tomlinson, and Neil deGrasse Tyson.

During this season, the guys head to South Korea after discovering Quagmire's past as a Korean soap-opera star ("Candy, Quahog Marshmallow"), Chris becomes a registered sex offender ("An App a Day"), Stewie has a nightmare and sends Brian into his mind to find the root of the problem ("A Lot Going on Upstairs"), Stewie builds a robot friend ("Guy, Robot"), Peter's drunken antics gets the town's drinking age raised to 50 years old ("Underage Peter"), Brian and Stewie get hooked on Adderall ("Pilling Them Softly"), Peter reunites with his bullying estranged sister ("Peter's Sister"), and Chris runs for homecoming king ("Run, Chris, Run").


Episode list

References

Family Guy seasons
Family Guy (season 14) episodes
2015 American television seasons
2016 American television seasons